John Trotwood Moore (1858–1929) was an American journalist, writer and local historian. He was the author of many poems, short stories and novels. He served as the State Librarian and Archivist of Tennessee from 1919 to 1929.  He was "an apologist for the Old South", and a proponent of lynching.

Early life
John Moore, Jr., was born on August 26, 1858 in Marion, Alabama. He was of Scotch-Irish descent. His father, John Moore, was a lawyer and Confederate veteran. His mother was named Emily. He had a sister, who later married a professor at Vanderbilt University.

Moore graduated from Howard College, now known as Samford University, where he studied the classics, and was a member of the Sigma Chi Fraternity. While in college, he wrote The Howard College Magazine. Later, he read law with Hilary A. Herbert.

Career
Moore started his career as a journalist for The Marion Commonwealth, a newspaper in Marion, Alabama. He was a schoolteacher in Monterey, Butler County, Alabama and a school principal in Pine Apple, Alabama in the early 1880s.

Moore became a columnist for Clark's Horse Review in 1885. He took the penname of "Trotwood" after Betsey Trotwood, a character in Charles Dickens's David Copperfield. His column, called "Pacing Department", included short stories, poems and local histories. In 1897, Moore decided to publish a collection of his columns, entitled Songs and Stories from Tennessee. Four years later, in 1901, he published his first novel A Summer Hymnal. Over the years, Moore published several other novels.

Moore founded Trotwood's Monthly, an agrarian magazine, in 1905. A year later, as it merged with Robert Love Taylor's magazine, it became known as the Taylor-Trotwood Magazine. Moore was the chief writer and editor. The magazine was discontinued in 1910. Meanwhile, he was the author of historical sketches on Andrew Jackson, Andrew Johnson, James K. Polk and Sam Houston. He was also a contributor to The Saturday Evening Post.

Moore was "an apologist for the Old South." Labeled a "local colorist", Moore's fiction typically included African Americans, horses, Native Americans, bluegrass, and Tennessee culture. The main repeating character in his stories, Old Wash, was compared to the Uncle Remus character created by his contemporary, Joel Chandler Harris. Moore was contemptuous of low-class whites and criticized Thomas Dixon for writing sensationalist novels.

Moore was openly racist. His racist ideas were reinforced by his reading Joseph Widney's 1907 Race Life of the Aryan Peoples, a book recommended to him by Theodore Roosevelt, which Moore proceeded to review favorably. He was a defender of the Ku Klux Klan and a proponent of lynching. Additionally, Moore was francophobic for racist reasons, lambasting the French for "intermarrying with the Indians and treating them as equals" during the French colonization of the Americas.

Moore was appointed as the State Librarian and Archivist for Tennessee by Governor Albert H. Roberts in March 1919. He was recommended by businessman James Erwin Caldwell. He served in this capacity until 1929. He was invited to give a speech at the dedication of a bronze plaque in honor of President Jefferson Davis at St. John's Episcopal Church in Montgomery, Alabama in May 1925.

Personal life
Moore married Florence W. Allen in February 1885. They resided in Columbia, Tennessee, where they raised Tennessee Pacers on their farm. After his first wife died in 1896, Moore married Mary Brown Daniel on June 13, 1900. They had a son, and two daughters. They resided in South Nashville, Tennessee, where they organized possum hunts and literary gatherings.

Moore was Presbyterian.

Death and legacy
Moore died on May 10, 1929, in Nashville. The governor of Tennessee ordered state offices closed and flags to fly at half-mast. He was also one of the honorary pallbearers, along with four past governors. The actual pallbearers were African Americans clad in Confederate grey. He was buried at the Mount Olivet Cemetery.

After his death, his widow was appointed State Librarian and Archivist for Tennessee. She served in this capacity until 1949. Meanwhile, their son, Merrill Moore, became a poet and member of a circle of writers known as "The Fugitives", who were partly inspired by Moore's own writing. One of his daughters, Helen Lane Moore, married Whitefoord Russell Cole, Jr., the son of railroad executive Whitefoord Russell Cole.

In 2019, the plaque that Moore dedicated to Jefferson Davis at a church in 1925 was moved to the church's archives. The pastor cited Moore's involvement as one of the reasons for the removal.

Bibliography

Further reading

References

External links
 
Works by John Trotwood Moore on the Internet Archive

1858 births
1929 deaths
American people of Scotch-Irish descent
People from Marion, Alabama
People from Columbia, Tennessee
People from Nashville, Tennessee
Samford University alumni
Novelists from Tennessee
American male journalists
American columnists
19th-century American historians
American male short story writers
American male novelists
American male poets
American Presbyterians
19th-century American short story writers
20th-century American short story writers
19th-century American male writers
Writers of American Southern literature
American white supremacists
Horse breeders
20th-century American male writers
20th-century American non-fiction writers